Park Sung-soo (born May 19, 1970) is a South Korean archer and Olympic champion. He competed at the 1988 Summer Olympics in Seoul, where he won a gold medal with the South Korean archery team, and also an individual silver medal.

References

External links

1970 births
Living people
South Korean male archers
Olympic archers of South Korea
Archers at the 1988 Summer Olympics
Olympic gold medalists for South Korea
Olympic silver medalists for South Korea
Olympic medalists in archery
Medalists at the 1988 Summer Olympics
20th-century South Korean people
21st-century South Korean people